DISCOM may refer to:

 a divisional support command, a unit in a division of the United States Army
 an electricity distribution company